Mircea Anca (10 June 1960 – 28 November 2015) was a Romanian film actor and director.

He graduated from the I.L. Caragiale Institute of Theatre and Film Arts in 1989 with specialty acting, and in 2003 with specialty theater directing.

Filmography
 Moromeții (1987) 
  – Captain Alber (1988)
 Kilometrul 36 (1989)
 Hotel de lux (1992)
 Numai iubirea (2004) – Dr. Cojocaru
 Băieți buni (2005) – Francezu
 Iubire ca în filme (2006) – Mr. Sturza

References

External links

1960 births
2015 deaths
People from Maramureș County
20th-century Romanian male actors
21st-century Romanian male actors
Romanian theatre directors
Caragiale National University of Theatre and Film alumni